Comberford is a small settlement in Staffordshire, England. Historically part of the parish of Wigginton, it is now within the Wigginton and Hopwas civil parish in the district of Lichfield.

There is an Anglican church in the village, dedicated to St Mary and St George.

References

External links
Comberford at Streetmap.co.uk

Villages in Staffordshire
Lichfield District